Utricularia dunlopii is an annual terrestrial carnivorous plant that belongs to the genus Utricularia (family Lentibulariaceae). Its distribution ranges from Western Australia to the Northern Territory.

See also 
 List of Utricularia species

References 

Carnivorous plants of Australia
Flora of the Northern Territory
Eudicots of Western Australia
dunlopii
Lamiales of Australia